Slidex was a hand-held, paper-based encryption system used at a low, front line (platoon, troop and section) level in the British Army during the Cold War period. It was replaced by the BATCO tactical code, which, in turn has been largely made obsolete by the Bowman secure voice radios.

Design 
Slidex used a series of vocabulary cards arranged in a grid of 12 rows and 17 columns. Each of the 204 resulting cells has a word or phrase, as well as a letter or number. The latter allowed the system to spell out words and transmit numbers.

The cards were stored in a folding case that had a pair of cursors to facilitate locating cells. Messages were encrypted and decrypted using code strips that could be placed in holder along the top and left side of the vocabulary card. Blank vocabulary cards were provided to allow units to create a word set for a specific mission.

See also
Encryption algorithm
Military intelligence

Further reading
 "The Slidex RT Code", Cryptologia 8(2), April 1984

References

 Photographs and description of Slidex
 Photographs of Slidex

History of cryptography
Military communications of the United Kingdom